Michael Peter Bruno  (Hebrew: מיכאל ברונו) (30 July 193226 December 1996) was an Israeli economist. He was governor of the Bank of Israel and a former World Bank Chief Economist.

Biography
Michael Peter Bruno was married to Ofra Hanoch (née Hirshenberg), with whom he had three children, daughter Yael and sons Ido and Asa. He died of cancer at home in Jerusalem.He is survived by his second wife Netta (née Ben-Porath).

Awards and recognition
 In 1970, Bruno was appointed the Carl Melchior chair of international economics.
 In 1974, he was awarded the Rothschild Prize for Social Science.
 In 1994, he was awarded the Israel Prize, for economics.

Published works

See also 
 List of Israel Prize recipients

References

Further reading
 
 
 Daniel Maman and Zeev Rosenhek. 2011. The Israeli Central Bank: Political Economy, Global Logics and Local Actors, Routledge.

1932 births
1996 deaths
20th-century  Israeli  economists
Alumni of King's College, Cambridge
Fellows of the Econometric Society
Harvard University staff
Hebrew Reali School alumni
Israel Prize in economics recipients
Israeli officials of the United Nations
Jewish emigrants from Nazi Germany to Mandatory Palestine
Members of the Israel Academy of Sciences and Humanities
Presidents of the Econometric Society
Stanford University alumni
World Bank Chief Economists